Polycystic ovary syndrome, or PCOS, is the most common endocrine disorder in women of reproductive age. The syndrome is named after the characteristic cysts which may form on the ovaries, though it is important to note that this is a symptom and not the underlying cause of the disorder.

Women with PCOS may experience irregular menstrual periods, heavy periods, excess hair, acne, pelvic pain, difficulty getting pregnant, and patches of thick, darker, velvety skin. The primary characteristics of this syndrome include: hyperandrogenism, anovulation, insulin resistance, and neuroendocrine disruption.

A review of the international evidence found that the prevalence of PCOS could be as high as 26% among some populations, though ranges between 4% and 18% are reported for general populations. Despite its high prevalence, the exact cause of PCOS remains uncertain and there is no known cure.

Definition 
Two definitions are commonly used:
 NIH
 In 1990 a consensus workshop sponsored by the NIH/NICHD suggested that a person has PCOS if they have all of the following:
 oligoovulation
 signs of androgen excess (clinical or biochemical)
 exclusion of other disorders that can result in menstrual irregularity and hyperandrogenism
 Rotterdam
In 2003 a consensus workshop sponsored by ESHRE/ASRM in Rotterdam indicated PCOS to be present if any two out of three criteria are met, in the absence of other entities that might cause these findings:
 oligoovulation and/or anovulation
 excess androgen activity
 polycystic ovaries (by gynecologic ultrasound)

The Rotterdam definition is wider, including many more women, the most notable ones being women without androgen excess. Critics say that findings obtained from the study of women with androgen excess cannot necessarily be extrapolated to women without androgen excess.
 Androgen Excess PCOS Society
 In 2006, the Androgen Excess PCOS Society suggested a tightening of the diagnostic criteria to all of the following:
 excess androgen activity
 oligoovulation/anovulation and/or polycystic ovaries
 exclusion of other entities that would cause excess androgen activity

Signs and symptoms 
Signs and symptoms of PCOS include irregular or no menstrual periods, heavy periods, excess body and facial hair, acne, pelvic pain, difficulty getting pregnant, and patches of thick, darker, velvety skin. This metabolic, endocrine and reproductive disorder is not universally defined, but the most common symptoms are irregular or absent periods, ovarian cysts, enlarged ovaries, excess androgen, weight gain and hirsutism. Associated conditions include type 2 diabetes, obesity, obstructive sleep apnea, heart disease, mood disorders, and endometrial cancer. This disease is related to the number of follicles per ovary each month growing from the average range of 6-8 to double, triple or more. it is important to distinguish between PCOS (the syndrome) and a woman with PCO (polycystic ovaries): to have PCOS, a woman must have at least two of these three symptoms (PCO, anovulation/oligoovulation and hyperandrogenism). This means that a woman can have PCOS (displaying anovulation and hyperandrogenism) without having PCO. Conversely, having PCO does not indicate that a person necessarily has PCOS.

Common signs and symptoms of PCOS include the following:

 Menstrual disorders: PCOS mostly produces oligomenorrhea (fewer than nine menstrual periods in a year) or amenorrhea (no menstrual periods for three or more consecutive months), but other types of menstrual disorders may also occur.
 Infertility: This generally results directly from chronic anovulation (lack of ovulation).
 High levels of masculinizing hormones: Known as hyperandrogenism, the most common signs are acne and hirsutism (male pattern of hair growth, such as on the chin or chest), but it may produce hypermenorrhea (heavy and prolonged menstrual periods), androgenic alopecia (increased hair thinning or diffuse hair loss), or other symptoms. Approximately three-quarters of women with PCOS (by the diagnostic criteria of NIH/NICHD 1990) have evidence of hyperandrogenemia.
 Metabolic syndrome: This appears as a tendency towards central obesity and other symptoms associated with insulin resistance, including low energy levels and food cravings. Serum insulin, insulin resistance, and homocysteine levels are higher in women with PCOS.
 Polycystic ovaries: Ovaries might get enlarged and comprise follicles surrounding the eggs. As result, ovaries might fail to function regularly.

Women with PCOS tend to have central obesity, but studies are conflicting as to whether visceral and subcutaneous abdominal fat is increased, unchanged, or decreased in women with PCOS relative to reproductively normal women with the same body mass index. In any case, androgens, such as testosterone, androstanolone (dihydrotestosterone), and nandrolone decanoate have been found to increase visceral fat deposition in both female animals and women.

Although 80% of PCOS presents in women with obesity, 20% of women diagnosed with the disease are non-obese or "lean" women. However, obese women that have PCOS have a higher risk of adverse outcomes, such as hypertension, insulin resistance, metabolic syndrome, and endometrial hyperplasia.

Even though most women with PCOS are overweight or obese, it is important to acknowledge that non-overweight women can also be diagnosed with PCOS. Up to 30% of women diagnosed with PCOS maintain a normal weight before and after diagnosis. "Lean" women still face the various symptoms of PCOS with the added challenges of having their symptoms properly addressed and recognized. Lean women often go undiagnosed for years, and usually are diagnosed after struggles to conceive. Lean women are likely to have a missed diagnosis of diabetes and cardiovascular disease. These women also have an increased risk of developing insulin resistance, despite not being overweight. Lean women are often taken less seriously with their diagnosis of PCOS, and also face challenges finding appropriate treatment options. This is because most treatment options are limited to approaches of losing weight and healthy dieting.

Hormone levels 
Testosterone levels are usually elevated in women with PCOS. In a 2020 systematic review and meta-analysis of sexual dysfunction related to PCOS which included 5,366 women with PCOS from 21 studies, testosterone levels were analyzed and were found to be 2.34 nmol/L (67 ng/dL) in women with PCOS and 1.57 nmol/L (45 ng/dL) in women without PCOS. In a 1995 study of 1,741 women with PCOS, mean testosterone levels were 2.6 (1.1–4.8) nmol/L (75 (32–140) ng/dL). In a 1998 study which reviewed many studies and subjected them to meta-analysis, testosterone levels in women with PCOS were 62 to 71 ng/dL (2.2–2.5 nmol/L) and testosterone levels in women without PCOS were about 32 ng/dL (1.1 nmol/L). In a 2010 study of 596 women with PCOS which used liquid chromatography–mass spectrometry (LC–MS) to quantify testosterone, median levels of testosterone were 41 and 47 ng/dL (with 25th–75th percentiles of 34–65 ng/dL and 27–58 ng/dL and ranges of 12–184 ng/dL and 1–205 ng/dL) via two different labs. If testosterone levels are above 100 to 200 ng/dL, per different sources, other possible causes of hyperandrogenism, such as congenital adrenal hyperplasia or an androgen-secreting tumor, may be present and should be excluded.

Associated conditions 
Warning signs may include a change in appearance. But there are also manifestations of mental health problems, such as anxiety, depression, and eating disorders.

A diagnosis of PCOS suggests an increased risk of the following:

 Endometrial hyperplasia and endometrial cancer (cancer of the uterine lining) are possible, due to overaccumulation of uterine lining, and also lack of progesterone, resulting in prolonged stimulation of uterine cells by estrogen. It is not clear whether this risk is directly due to the syndrome or from the associated obesity, hyperinsulinemia, and hyperandrogenism.
 Insulin resistance/type 2 diabetes. A review published in 2010 concluded that women with PCOS have an elevated prevalence of insulin resistance and type 2 diabetes, even when controlling for body mass index (BMI). PCOS is also associated with higher risk for diabetes.
 High blood pressure, in particular if obese or during pregnancy
 Depression and anxiety
 Dyslipidemia – disorders of lipid metabolism – cholesterol and triglycerides. Women with PCOS show a decreased removal of atherosclerosis-inducing remnants, seemingly independent of insulin resistance/type 2 diabetes.
 Cardiovascular disease, with a meta-analysis estimating a 2-fold risk of arterial disease for women with PCOS relative to women without PCOS, independent of BMI.
 Strokes
 Weight gain
 Miscarriage
 Sleep apnea, particularly if obesity is present
 Non-alcoholic fatty liver disease, particularly if obesity is present
 Acanthosis nigricans (patches of darkened skin under the arms, in the groin area, on the back of the neck)
 Autoimmune thyroiditis
 Some studies report a higher incidence of PCOS among transgender men (prior to taking testosterone), though not all have not found the same association. People with PCOS in general are also reportedly more likely to see themselves as "sexually undifferentiated" or "androgynous" and "less likely to identify with a female gender scheme."
The risk of ovarian cancer and breast cancer is not significantly increased overall.

Cause 
PCOS is caused by a combination of genetic and environmental factors. Risk factors include obesity, a lack of physical exercise, and a family history of someone with the condition. Transgender men may also experience a higher than expected rate of PCOS. Diagnosis is based on two of the following three findings: anovulation, high androgen levels, and ovarian cysts. Cysts may be detectable by ultrasound. Other conditions that produce similar symptoms include adrenal hyperplasia, hypothyroidism, and high blood levels of prolactin.

PCOS is a heterogeneous disorder of uncertain cause. There is some evidence that it is a genetic disease. Such evidence includes the familial clustering of cases, greater concordance in monozygotic compared with dizygotic twins and heritability of endocrine and metabolic features of PCOS. There is some evidence that exposure to higher than typical levels of androgens and the anti-Müllerian hormone (AMH) in utero increases the risk of developing PCOS in later life.

Genetics 
The genetic component appears to be inherited in an autosomal dominant fashion with high genetic penetrance but variable expressivity in females; this means that each child has a 50% chance of inheriting the predisposing genetic variant(s) from a parent, and, if a daughter receives the variant(s), the daughter will have the disease to some extent. The genetic variant(s) can be inherited from either the father or the mother, and can be passed along to both sons (who may be asymptomatic carriers or may have symptoms such as early baldness and/or excessive hair) and daughters, who will show signs of PCOS. The phenotype appears to manifest itself at least partially via heightened androgen levels secreted by ovarian follicle theca cells from women with the allele. The exact gene affected has not yet been identified. In rare instances, single-gene mutations can give rise to the phenotype of the syndrome. Current understanding of the pathogenesis of the syndrome suggests, however, that it is a complex multigenic disorder.

Due to the scarcity of large-scale screening studies, the prevalence of endometrial abnormalities in PCOS remains unknown, though women with the condition may be at increased risk for endometrial hyperplasia and carcinoma as well as menstrual dysfunction and infertility.

The severity of PCOS symptoms appears to be largely determined by factors such as obesity.
PCOS has some aspects of a metabolic disorder, since its symptoms are partly reversible. Even though considered as a gynecological problem, PCOS consists of 28 clinical symptoms.

Even though the name suggests that the ovaries are central to disease pathology, cysts are a symptom instead of the cause of the disease. Some symptoms of PCOS will persist even if both ovaries are removed; the disease can appear even if cysts are absent. Since its first description by Stein and Leventhal in 1935, the criteria of diagnosis, symptoms, and causative factors are subject to debate. Gynecologists often see it as a gynecological problem, with the ovaries being the primary organ affected. However, recent insights show a multisystem disorder, with the primary problem lying in hormonal regulation in the hypothalamus, with the involvement of many organs. The term PCOS is used due to the fact that there is a wide spectrum of symptoms possible. It is common to have polycystic ovaries without having PCOS; approximately 20% of European women  have polcystic ovaries, but most of those women do not have PCOS.

Environment 
PCOS may be related to or worsened by exposures during the prenatal period, epigenetic factors, environmental impacts (especially industrial endocrine disruptors, such as bisphenol A and certain drugs) and the increasing rates of obesity.

Endocrine disruptors are defined as chemicals that can interfere with the endocrine system by mimicking hormones such as estrogen. According to the NIH (National Institute of Health), examples of endocrine disruptors can include dioxins and triclosan. Endocrine disruptors can cause adverse health impacts in animals.  Additional research is needed to assess the role that endocrine disruptors may play in disrupting reproductive health in women and possibly triggering or exacerbating PCOS and its related symptoms.

Pathogenesis 
Polycystic ovaries develop when the ovaries are stimulated to produce excessive amounts of androgenic hormones, in particular testosterone, by either one or a combination of the following (almost certainly combined with genetic susceptibility):

 the release of excessive luteinizing hormone (LH) by the anterior pituitary gland
 through high levels of insulin in the blood (hyperinsulinaemia) in women whose ovaries are sensitive to this stimulus

A majority of women with PCOS have insulin resistance and/or are obese, which is a strong risk factor for insulin resistance, although insulin resistance is a common finding among women with PCOS in normal-weight women as well. Elevated insulin levels contribute to or cause the abnormalities seen in the hypothalamic–pituitary–ovarian axis that lead to PCOS. Hyperinsulinemia increases GnRH pulse frequency, which in turn results in an increase in the LH/FSH ratio increased ovarian androgen production; decreased follicular maturation; and decreased SHBG binding. Furthermore, excessive insulin increases the activity of 17α-hydroxylase, which catalyzes the conversion of progesterone to androstenedione, which is in turn converted to testosterone. The combined effects of hyperinsulinemia contribute to an increased risk of PCOS.

Adipose (fat) tissue possesses aromatase, an enzyme that converts androstenedione to estrone and testosterone to estradiol. The excess of adipose tissue in obese women creates the paradox of having both excess androgens (which are responsible for hirsutism and virilization) and excess estrogens (which inhibit FSH via negative feedback).

The syndrome acquired its most widely used name due to the common sign on ultrasound examination of multiple (poly) ovarian cysts. These "cysts" are in fact immature ovarian follicles. The follicles have developed from primordial follicles, but this development has stopped ("arrested") at an early stage, due to the disturbed ovarian function. The follicles may be oriented along the ovarian periphery, appearing as a 'string of pearls' on ultrasound examination.

PCOS may be associated with chronic inflammation, with several investigators correlating inflammatory mediators with anovulation and other PCOS symptoms. Similarly, there seems to be a relation between PCOS and an increased level of oxidative stress.

Diagnosis 
Not every person with PCOS has polycystic ovaries (PCO), nor does everyone with ovarian cysts have PCOS; although a pelvic ultrasound is a major diagnostic tool, it is not the only one. The diagnosis is fairly straightforward using the Rotterdam criteria, even when the syndrome is associated with a wide range of symptoms.

Differential diagnosis 
Other causes of irregular or absent menstruation and hirsutism, such as hypothyroidism, congenital adrenal hyperplasia (21-hydroxylase deficiency), Cushing's syndrome, hyperprolactinemia, androgen-secreting neoplasms, and other pituitary or adrenal disorders, should be investigated.

Assessment and testing

Standard assessment 
 History-taking, specifically for menstrual pattern, obesity, hirsutism and acne. A clinical prediction rule found that these four questions can diagnose PCOS with a sensitivity of 77.1% (95% confidence interval [CI] 62.7%–88.0%) and a specificity of 93.8% (95% CI 82.8%–98.7%).
 Gynecologic ultrasonography, specifically looking for small ovarian follicles. These are believed to be the result of disturbed ovarian function with failed ovulation, reflected by the infrequent or absent menstruation that is typical of the condition. In a normal menstrual cycle, one egg is released from a dominant follicle – in essence, a cyst that bursts to release the egg. After ovulation, the follicle remnant is transformed into a progesterone-producing corpus luteum, which shrinks and disappears after approximately 12–14 days. In PCOS, there is a so-called "follicular arrest"; i.e., several follicles develop to a size of 5–7 mm, but not further. No single follicle reaches the preovulatory size (16 mm or more). According to the Rotterdam criteria, which are widely used for diagnosis of PCOS, 12 or more small follicles should be seen in a suspect ovary on ultrasound examination. More recent research suggests that there should be at least 25 follicles in an ovary to designate it as having polycystic ovarian morphology (PCOM) in women aged 18–35 years. The follicles may be oriented in the periphery, giving the appearance of a 'string of pearls'. If a high-resolution transvaginal ultrasonography machine is not available, an ovarian volume of at least 10 ml is regarded as an acceptable definition of having polycystic ovarian morphology. rather than follicle count.
 Laparoscopic examination may reveal a thickened, smooth, pearl-white outer surface of the ovary. (This would usually be an incidental finding if laparoscopy were performed for some other reason, as it would not be routine to examine the ovaries in this way to confirm a diagnosis of PCOS.)
 Serum (blood) levels of androgens, including androstenedione and testosterone may be elevated. Dehydroepiandrosterone sulfate (DHEA-S) levels above 700–800 µg/dL are highly suggestive of adrenal dysfunction because DHEA-S is made exclusively by the adrenal glands. The free testosterone level is thought to be the best measure, with approximately 60 per cent of PCOS patients demonstrating supranormal levels.

Some other blood tests are suggestive but not diagnostic. The ratio of LH (luteinizing hormone) to FSH (follicle-stimulating hormone), when measured in international units, is elevated in women with PCOS. Common cut-offs to designate abnormally high LH/FSH ratios are 2:1 or 3:1 as tested on day 3 of the menstrual cycle. The pattern is not very sensitive; a ratio of 2:1 or higher was present in less than 50% of women with PCOS in one study. There are often low levels of sex hormone-binding globulin, in particular among obese or overweight women.
Anti-Müllerian hormone (AMH) is increased in PCOS, and may become part of its diagnostic criteria.

Glucose tolerance testing 
 Two-hour oral glucose tolerance test (GTT) in women with risk factors (obesity, family history, history of gestational diabetes) may indicate impaired glucose tolerance (insulin resistance) in 15–33% of women with PCOS. Frank diabetes can be seen in 65–68% of women with this condition. Insulin resistance can be observed in both normal weight and overweight people, although it is more common in the latter (and in those matching the stricter NIH criteria for diagnosis); 50–80% of people with PCOS may have insulin resistance at some level.
 Fasting insulin level or GTT with insulin levels (also called IGTT). Elevated insulin levels have been helpful to predict response to medication and may indicate women needing higher doses of metformin or the use of a second medication to significantly lower insulin levels. Elevated blood sugar and insulin values do not predict who responds to an insulin-lowering medication, low-glycemic diet, and exercise. Many women with normal levels may benefit from combination therapy. A hypoglycemic response in which the two-hour insulin level is higher and the blood sugar lower than fasting is consistent with insulin resistance. A mathematical derivation known as the HOMAI, calculated from the fasting values in glucose and insulin concentrations, allows a direct and moderately accurate measure of insulin sensitivity (glucose-level x insulin-level/22.5).

Management 
The primary treatments for PCOS include lifestyle changes and use of medications.

Goals of treatment may be considered under four categories:
 Lowering of insulin resistance
 Restoration of fertility
 Treatment of hirsutism or acne
 Restoration of regular menstruation, and prevention of endometrial hyperplasia and endometrial cancer

In each of these areas, there is considerable debate as to the optimal treatment. One of the major factors underlying the debate is the lack of large-scale clinical trials comparing different treatments. Smaller trials tend to be less reliable and hence may produce conflicting results. General interventions that help to reduce weight or insulin resistance can be beneficial for all these aims, because they address what is believed to be the underlying cause. As PCOS appears to cause significant emotional distress, appropriate support may be useful.

Diet 
Where PCOS is associated with overweight or obesity, successful weight loss is the most effective method of restoring normal ovulation/menstruation. The American Association of Clinical Endocrinologists guidelines recommend a goal of achieving 10–15% weight loss or more, which improves insulin resistance and all hormonal disorders. Still, many women find it very difficult to achieve and sustain significant weight loss. Insulin resistance itself can cause increased food cravings and lower energy levels, which can make it difficult to lose weight on a regular weight-loss diet. A scientific review in 2013 found similar improvements in weight, body composition and pregnancy rate, menstrual regularity, ovulation, hyperandrogenism, insulin resistance, lipids, and quality of life to occur with weight loss, independent of diet composition. Still, a low GI diet, in which a significant portion of total carbohydrates is obtained from fruit, vegetables, and whole-grain sources, has resulted in greater menstrual regularity than a macronutrient-matched healthy diet.

Vitamin D deficiency may play some role in the development of the metabolic syndrome, and treatment of any such deficiency is indicated. However, a systematic review of 2015 found no evidence that vitamin D supplementation reduced or mitigated metabolic and hormonal dysregulations in PCOS. As of 2012, interventions using dietary supplements to correct metabolic deficiencies in people with PCOS had been tested in small, uncontrolled and nonrandomized clinical trials; the resulting data are insufficient to recommend their use.

Medications 
Medications for PCOS include oral contraceptives and metformin. The oral contraceptives increase sex hormone binding globulin production, which increases binding of free testosterone. This reduces the symptoms of hirsutism caused by high testosterone and regulates return to normal menstrual periods. Metformin is a medication commonly used in type 2 diabetes mellitus to reduce insulin resistance, and is used off label (in the UK, US, AU and EU) to treat insulin resistance seen in PCOS. In many cases, metformin also supports ovarian function and return to normal ovulation. Spironolactone can be used for its antiandrogenic effects, and the topical cream eflornithine can be used to reduce facial hair. A newer insulin resistance medication class, the thiazolidinediones (glitazones), have shown equivalent efficacy to metformin, but metformin has a more favorable side effect profile. The United Kingdom's National Institute for Health and Clinical Excellence recommended in 2004 that women with PCOS and a body mass index above 25 be given metformin when other therapy has failed to produce results. Metformin may not be effective in every type of PCOS, and therefore there is some disagreement about whether it should be used as a general first line therapy. In addition to this, metformin is associated with several unpleasant side effects: including abdominal pain, metallic taste in the mouth, diarrhoea and vomiting. The use of statins in the management of underlying metabolic syndrome remains unclear.

It can be difficult to become pregnant with PCOS because it causes irregular ovulation. Medications to induce fertility when trying to conceive include the ovulation inducer clomiphene or pulsatile leuprorelin.  Evidence from randomised controlled trials suggests that in terms of live birth, metformin may be better than placebo, and metform plus clomiphene may be better than clomiphene alone, but that in both cases women may be more likely to experience gastrointestinal side effects with metformin.

Metformin is thought to be safe to use during pregnancy (pregnancy category B in the US). A review in 2014 concluded that the use of metformin does not increase the risk of major birth defects in women treated with metformin during the first trimester. Liraglutide may reduce weight and waist circumference in people with PCOS more than other medications.

Infertility 

Not all women with PCOS have difficulty becoming pregnant. But some women with PCOS may have difficulty getting pregnant since their body does not produce the hormones necessary for regular ovulation. PCOS might also increase the risk of miscarriage or premature delivery. However, it is possible to have a normal pregnancy. Including medical care and a healthy lifestyle to follow.

For those that do, anovulation or infrequent ovulation is a common cause and PCOS is the main cause of anovulatory infertility. Other factors include changed levels of gonadotropins, hyperandrogenemia, and hyperinsulinemia. Like women without PCOS, women with PCOS that are ovulating may be infertile due to other causes, such as tubal blockages due to a history of sexually transmitted diseases.

For overweight anovulatory women with PCOS, weight loss and diet adjustments, especially to reduce the intake of simple carbohydrates, are associated with resumption of natural ovulation. Digital health interventions have been shown to be particularly effective in providing combined therapy to manage PCOS through both lifestyle changes and medication.

For those women that after weight loss still are anovulatory or for anovulatory lean women, then ovulation induction using the medications letrozole or clomiphene citrate are the principal treatments used to promote ovulation. Previously, the anti-diabetes medication metformin was recommended treatment for anovulation, but it appears less effective than letrozole or clomiphene.

For women not responsive to letrozole or clomiphene and diet and lifestyle modification, there are options available including assisted reproductive technology procedures such as controlled ovarian hyperstimulation with follicle-stimulating hormone (FSH) injections followed by in vitro fertilisation (IVF).

Though surgery is not commonly performed, the polycystic ovaries can be treated with a laparoscopic procedure called "ovarian drilling" (puncture of 4–10 small follicles with electrocautery, laser, or biopsy needles), which often results in either resumption of spontaneous ovulations or ovulations after adjuvant treatment with clomiphene or FSH. (Ovarian wedge resection is no longer used as much due to complications such as adhesions and the presence of frequently effective medications.) There are, however, concerns about the long-term effects of ovarian drilling on ovarian function.

Mental Health 
Although women with PCOS are far more likely to have depression than women without, the evidence for anti-depressant use in women with PCOS remains inconclusive. However, the pathophysiology of depression and mental stress during PCOS is linked to various changes including psychological changes such as high activity of pro-inflammatory markers and immune system during stress.

PCOS is associated with other mental health related conditions besides depression such as anxiety, bipolar disorder, and obsessive–compulsive disorder.

Hirsutism and acne 

When appropriate (e.g., in women of child-bearing age who require contraception), a standard contraceptive pill is frequently effective in reducing hirsutism. Progestogens such as norgestrel and levonorgestrel should be avoided due to their androgenic effects. Metformin combined with an oral contraceptive may be more effective than either metformin or the oral contraceptive on its own.

Other medications with anti-androgen effects include flutamide, and spironolactone, which can give some improvement in hirsutism. Metformin can reduce hirsutism, perhaps by reducing insulin resistance, and is often used if there are other features such as insulin resistance, diabetes, or obesity that should also benefit from metformin. Eflornithine (Vaniqa) is a medication that is applied to the skin in cream form, and acts directly on the hair follicles to inhibit hair growth. It is usually applied to the face. 5-alpha reductase inhibitors (such as finasteride and dutasteride) may also be used; they work by blocking the conversion of testosterone to dihydrotestosterone (the latter of which responsible for most hair growth alterations and androgenic acne).

Although these agents have shown significant efficacy in clinical trials (for oral contraceptives, in 60–100% of individuals), the reduction in hair growth may not be enough to eliminate the social embarrassment of hirsutism, or the inconvenience of plucking or shaving. Individuals vary in their response to different therapies. It is usually worth trying other medications if one does not work, but medications do not work well for all individuals.

Menstrual irregularity 
If fertility is not the primary aim, then menstruation can usually be regulated with a contraceptive pill. The purpose of regulating menstruation, in essence, is for the woman's convenience, and perhaps her sense of well-being; there is no medical requirement for regular periods, as long as they occur sufficiently often.

If a regular menstrual cycle is not desired, then therapy for an irregular cycle is not necessarily required. Most experts say that, if a menstrual bleed occurs at least every three months, then the endometrium (womb lining) is being shed sufficiently often to prevent an increased risk of endometrial abnormalities or cancer. If menstruation occurs less often or not at all, some form of progestogen replacement is recommended.

Alternative medicine 
A 2017 review concluded that while both myo-inositol and D-chiro-inositols may regulate menstrual cycles and improve ovulation, there is a lack of evidence regarding effects on the probability of pregnancy. A 2012 and 2017 review have found myo-inositol supplementation appears to be effective in improving several of the hormonal disturbances of PCOS. Myo-inositol reduces the amount of gonadotropins and the length of controlled ovarian hyperstimulation in women undergoing in vitro fertilization. A 2011 review found not enough evidence to conclude any beneficial effect from D-chiro-inositol. There is insufficient evidence to support the use of acupuncture, current studies are inconclusive and there's a need for additional randomized controlled trials.

Treatment 
PCOS has no cure, as of 2023. Treatment may involve lifestyle changes such as weight loss and exercise. Birth control pills may help with improving the regularity of periods, excess hair growth, and acne. Metformin and anti-androgens may also help. Other typical acne treatments and hair removal techniques may be used. Efforts to improve fertility include weight loss, metformin, and ovulation induction using clomiphene or letrozole. In vitro fertilization is used by some in whom other measures are not effective.

Epidemiology 
PCOS is the most common endocrine disorder among women between the ages of 18 and 44. It affects approximately 2% to 20% of this age group depending on how it is defined. When someone is infertile due to lack of ovulation, PCOS is the most common cause and could guide to patients' diagnosis. The earliest known description of what is now recognized as PCOS dates from 1721 in Italy.

The prevalence of PCOS depends on the choice of diagnostic criteria. The World Health Organization estimates that it affects 116 million women worldwide as of 2010 (3.4% of women). Another estimate indicates that 7% of women of reproductive age are affected. Another study using the Rotterdam criteria found that about 18% of women had PCOS, and that 70% of them were previously undiagnosed. Prevalence also varies across countries due to lack of large-scale scientific studies; India, for example, has a purported rate of 1 in 5 women having PCOS.

There are few studies that have investigated the racial differences in cardiometabolic factors in women with PCOS. There is also limited data on the racial differences in the risk of metabolic syndrome and cardiovascular disease in adolescents and young adults with PCOS. The first study to comprehensively examine racial differences discovered notable racial differences in risk factors for cardiovascular disease. African American women were found to be significantly more obese, with a significantly higher prevalence of metabolic syndrome compared to white adult women with PCOS. It is important for the further research of racial differences among women with PCOS, to ensure that every woman that is affected by PCOS has the available resources for management.

Ultrasonographic findings of polycystic ovaries are found in 8–25% of women non-affected by the syndrome. 14% women on oral contraceptives are found to have polycystic ovaries. Ovarian cysts are also a common side effect of levonorgestrel-releasing intrauterine devices (IUDs).

There are few studies that have investigated the racial differences in cardiometabolic factors in women with PCOS.

History 
The condition was first described in 1935 by American gynecologists Irving F. Stein, Sr. and Michael L. Leventhal, from whom its original name of Stein–Leventhal syndrome is taken. Stein and Leventhal first described PCOS as an endocrine disorder in the United States, and since then, it has become recognized as one of the most common causes of oligo ovulatory infertility among women.

The earliest published description of a person with what is now recognized as PCOS was in 1721 in Italy. Cyst-related changes to the ovaries were described in 1844.

Etymology 
Other names for this syndrome include polycystic ovarian syndrome, polycystic ovary disease, functional ovarian hyperandrogenism, ovarian hyperthecosis, sclerocystic ovary syndrome, and Stein–Leventhal syndrome. The eponymous last option is the original name; it is now used, if at all, only for the subset of women with all the symptoms of amenorrhea with infertility, hirsutism, and enlarged polycystic ovaries.

Most common names for this disease derive from a typical finding on medical images, called a polycystic ovary. A polycystic ovary has an abnormally large number of developing eggs visible near its surface, looking like many small cysts.

Society and culture
In 2005, 4 million cases of PCOS were reported in the US, costing $4.36 billion in healthcare costs. In 2016 out of the National Institute Health's research budget of $32.3 billion for that year, 0.1% was spent on PCOS research. Among those aged between 14 and 44, PCOS is conservatively estimated to cost $4.37 billion per year.

As opposed to women in the general population, women with PCOS experience higher rates of depression and anxiety. International guidelines and Indian guidelines suggest psychosocial factors should be considered in women with PCOS, as well as screenings for depression and anxiety. Globally, this aspect has been increasingly focused on because it reflects the true impact of PCOS on the lives of patients. Research shows that PCOS adversely impacts a patient's quality of life.

Public figures 
A number of celebrities and public figures have spoken about their experiences with PCOS, including:
 Victoria Beckham
 Harnaam Kaur
 Chrisette Michele
 Keke Palmer
 Frankie Bridge
 Daisy Ridley
 Romee Strijd
 Jaime King
Sasha Pieterse
 Lea Michele
 Maci Bookout

See also 

 Androgen-dependent syndromes
 PCOS Challenge (radio and video/television series)

References

Further reading

External links 
 

Endocrine gonad disorders
Endocrine-related cutaneous conditions
Gynaecologic disorders
Human female endocrine system
Human reproduction
Medical conditions related to obesity
Syndromes in females
Wikipedia medicine articles ready to translate